WAOA-FM (107.1 MHz) is a commercial radio station licensed to Melbourne and covering Florida's Space Coast. Owned by Cumulus Media, it broadcasts a Top 40 (CHR) radio format. It calls itself W A One A, named after Coastal Florida highway State Road A1A.  The radio studios and offices are on West Hibiscus Boulevard in Melbourne.

WAOA-FM has an effective radiated power (ERP) of 100,000 watts, the maximum power for non-grandfathered FM stations.   It can be heard as far north as Daytona Beach, as far west as Winter Haven and far south as Port St. Lucie.  Its transmitter is in Melbourne, on Harlock Road, visible from Interstate 95.  As of October 2007, the station was streamed online via iHeart Radio.

History
In November 1972, the station signed on as WTAI-FM with an adult contemporary music format. It briefly aired a beautiful music format in 1978.  Then on July 10, 1978, it changed its call sign to WLLV, and its format to Contemporary Christian music. On February 24, 1984, the call sign was switched to WVTI, and the format flipped to CHR.

On December 15, 1989 the station changed call signs again, becoming WAOA, and changed its format to Hot AC. It adjusted to regular AC in 1996, then back to CHR in 2002, a year after the station was bought by Cumulus. WAOA became the current WAOA-FM on June 29, 2000, when sister A.M. station WLZR became WAOA.

WAOA-FM is often ranked #1, the most-listened-to radio station in the Cocoa Beach-Melbourne-Titusville Nielsen Audio market.

References

External links

AOA-FM
Contemporary hit radio stations in the United States
Cumulus Media radio stations
1972 establishments in Florida
Radio stations established in 1972